The following is a list of railway stations (also known as railroad stations in the United States), which is indexed by country.

Africa
 Railway stations in Angola
 Railway stations in Benin
 Railway stations in Botswana
 Railway stations in Burkina Faso
 Railway stations in Cameroon
 Railway stations in Chad
 Railway stations in Republic of the Congo
 List of railway stations in the Democratic Republic of the Congo
 Railway stations in Côte d'Ivoire
 Railway stations in Djibouti
 Railway stations in Egypt
 Railway stations in Eritrea
 Railway stations in Ethiopia
 Railway stations in Ghana
 Railway stations in Guinea
 Railway stations in Kenya
 Railway stations in Lesotho
 Railway stations in Liberia
 Railway stations in Libya
 Railway stations in Madagascar
 Railway stations in Malawi
 Railway stations in Mali
 Railway stations in Mauritania
 Railway stations in Mauritius
 Railway stations in Morocco
 Railway stations in Mozambique
 Railway stations in Namibia
 Railway stations in Nigeria
 Railway stations in Réunion
 Railway stations in Rwanda
 Railway stations in Senegal
 Railway stations in Sierra Leone
 South Africa: Passenger Rail Agency of South Africa
 Railway stations in Sudan
 Railway stations in Swaziland
 Railway stations in Tanzania
 Railway stations in Togo
 Railway stations in Tunisia
 Railway stations in Uganda
 Railway stations in Zambia
 Railway stations in Zimbabwe

Asia 
 Railway stations in Armenia
 List of railway stations in Bangladesh
List of railway stations in Cambodia
 :Category:Railway stations in China
 List of railway stations in Pakistan
 Railway stations of Hong Kong
 List of railway stations in India
List of railway stations in Indonesia
 List of railway stations in Iran
 List of railway stations in Japan
 List of railway stations in North Korea
 :Category:Railway stations in South Korea
 :Category:Railway stations in Malaysia
 List of railway stations in Pakistan
 List of railway stations in the Philippines

Singapore 

 Woodlands train checkpoint

Sri Lanka

Taiwan

Thailand 
:Category: Railway stations in Thailand
List of Southern Line (Thailand) stations

Turkmenistan 
Ashgabat railway station
Turkmenbashi railway station

Europe

Austria
:Category:Railway stations in Austria

Belgium
:Category:Railway stations in Belgium

Czech Republic
:Category:Railway stations in the Czech Republic

Denmark

Estonia

Finland

France
 :Category:Railway stations in France

Germany

See German railway station categories for more information.

Greece

Hungary
Budapest
Eastern Railway Station (Keleti pályaudvar)
Western Railway Station (Nyugati pályaudvar)
Southern Railway Station (Déli pályaudvar)
Miskolc
Tiszai Station (Tiszai pályaudvar)
Gömöri Station (Gömöri pályaudvar)

Ireland

Italy

Luxembourg

Monaco

Netherlands

Norway
Arna Station
Bergen Station
Bogegrend Station
Bolstadøyri Station
Bulken Station
Dale Station
Drammen Station
Eggjareid Station
Evanger Station
Finse Station
Flå Station
Geilo Station
Gjerdåker Station
Gol Station
Hallingskeid Station
Haugastøl Station
Hønefoss Station
Jørnevik Station
Kløve Station
Kronstad Station
Ljosanbotn Station
Mjølfjell Station
Mosjøen Station
Myrdal Station
Nesbyen Station
Oslo Sentralstasjon
Reimegrend Station
Seimsgrend Station
Skiple Station
Stanghelle Station
Takvam Station
Torpo Station
Trengereid Station
Upsete Station
Urdland Station
Ustaoset Station
Vaksdal Station
Vieren Station
Volli Station
Voss Station
Ygre Station
Ørneberget Station
Øyeflaten Station
Ål Station

Poland
List of busiest railway stations in Poland
:Category:Railway stations in Poland

Portugal
 Rossio Railway Station in Lisbon (1886–1887)

Romania
  Brașov
 Brașov railway station
  Bucharest
 Gara de Nord
 Basarab railway station
  Cluj-Napoca
 Cluj-Napoca railway station
  Constanța
 Constanţa railway station
  Craiova
 Craiova railway station
  Iaşi
 Iaşi railway station
  Satu Mare
 Satu Mare railway station
  Sibiu
 Sibiu railway station
  Sinaia
 Sinaia railway station
  Timișoara
  Timișoara Nord railway station

Russia

Moscow
 (1851)
 (1862, rebuilt 1904)
 (1864, rebuilt 1913–40)
 (1870, rebuilt 1909)
 (1896, rebuilt 1972)
 (1899)
 (1900)
 (1903)
 (1912–18)
Saint Petersburg
 (1851)
 (1837, rebuilt 1904)
 (1857)
 (1860)
Finland Station (1870, rebuilt 1960)
 (2003)
Krasnodar
Krasnodar-1 railway station (1889)
Samara
Samara railway station (1876, rebuilt 1996–2001)

Spain
Barcelona - List of railway stations in Barcelona
Madrid - Atocha Railway Station
Madrid - Chamartín Railway Station
Sevilla - Santa Justa Railway Station
Toledo - Toledo Railway Station
Valencia - Norte Railway Station

Sweden
Stockholm - Stockholm Central Station

Switzerland

Basel
Basel SBB
Basel Badischer Bahnhof
Bern - Bern Rail Station
Geneva - Gare de Cornavin
Lausanne - Lausanne railway station
Zürich - Zürich Hauptbahnhof

Turkey

Ukraine

Darnytsia Railway Station
Kharkiv Railway Station
Kyiv Passenger Railway Station
Lviv Rail Terminal
Odessa Railway Station
Uzhhorod Central Rail Terminal

United Kingdom
UK railway stations A  B  C  D  E  F  G  H  I  J  K  L  M  N  O  P  Q  R  S  T  U  V  W  X  Y  Z
List of London railway stations
List of busiest railway stations in Great Britain
List of closed railway stations in Britain
List of Parkway railway stations in Britain
:Category:Lists of railway stations in Great Britain

Vatican City
Railway Station in the Vatican City

North America
:Category:Railway stations in Canada
:Category:Railway stations in the United States
:Category:Railway stations in Mexico

Oceania

Australia
Adelaide - List of Adelaide railway stations
Adelaide station
Brisbane - List of Brisbane railway stations
Central station
Roma Street station
Melbourne - List of Melbourne railway stations
Flinders Street station
Southern Cross station (formerly Spencer Street)
Perth - List of Perth railway stations
Perth station
New South Wales
List of Sydney Trains railway stations
List of NSW TrainLink railway stations
List of closed Sydney railway stations
Victoria
List of closed regional railway stations in Victoria

New Zealand
 Auckland - List of Auckland railway stations
 Britomart Transport Centre
 Dunedin station
 Wellington - List of Wellington railway stations

See also 

List of highest railway stations in the world
List of railway stations named after people
:Category:Lists of railway stations

Lists by country